Alexis Nolent (a.k.a. Matz) is a French writer. He writes scripts for videogames and has also written a novel and, under the pen name Matz, a number of comics.

Life and career
Nolent was born in Rouen, France, and grew up in the Caribbean, before moving to Paris.

His graphic novel Du Plomb Dans La Tete, AKA Headshot, was adapted into the 2012 film Bullet to the Head. He has written The Killer (Le Tueur) and Cyclops (Cyclopes) both of which have been optioned for films, also by producer Alexandra Milchan, the former at Paramount with director David Fincher and the latter at Warner Brothers by James Mangold. The Killer is his first to be published in English and is published by Archaia Studios Press, who are dividing each of volumes into two parts and releasing in American comic book format bi-monthly. The first four issues were collected as a hardcover volume, which won IGN's Best Indy Book of 2007 Award, Newsarama's Best of '07 gave it the "Best Comic You Didn't Read This Year" award and Entertainment Weekly named it #2 in a list of Best comics of 2007.

Other work includes Headshot (Du plomb dans la tête) with Colin Wilson, Shandy with Dominique Bertail and an upcoming adaptation of Jim Thompson's novel Savage Night with artist Miles Hyman.

The Killer has been optioned for a film.

Bibliography

 Peines perdues (with Jean-Christophe Chauzy, Casterman, August 1993)
 The Killer (with Luc Jacamon):
 French, Casterman:
 Long feu (October 1998)
 L'Engrenage (April 2000)
 La Dette (August 2001)
 Les Liens du sang (August 2002)
 La Mort dans l'âme (October 2003)
 Modus vivendi (September 2007)
 English, Archaia Studios Press:
 Volume 1 (collects #1-4: "'Long Fire" and "Vicious Cycle", hardcover, 128 pages, September 2007)
 Shandy (with Dominique Bertail, Delcourt):
 Agnès (November 2002)
 Le Dragon d'Austerlitz (January 2006)
 Du plomb dans la tête (aka Headshot) (with Colin Wilson, Casterman):
 Les Petits poissons (January 2004)
 Les Gros poissons (February 2005)
 Du bordel dans l'aquarium (January 2006)
 Cyclops (with Luc Jacamon, Casterman):
 La Recrue (September 2005)
 Le Héros (September 2006)

Awards

 2004: Won Best Story, Prix Saint-Michel, for Du plomb dans la tête
 2006:
 Won Best Comic (French language), Prix Saint-Michel, for Shandy 2: Le dragon d'Austerlitz
 Nominated for Best artwork, Prix Saint-Michel, for Shandy 2: Le dragon d'Austerlitz
 2007: Nominated for "Award for Favourite European Comics" Eagle Award, for The Killer.
 2008: Nominated for "Best U.S. Edition of International Material" Eisner Award, for The Killer.

Notes

References

Matz at Bedetheque

External links
 Matz at Casterman
 Matz at Delcourt
 Preview of The Killer #1

Interviews
 Matz Narks on The Killer, Comicon, June 6, 2006

Writers from Rouen
Living people
Video game writers
Year of birth missing (living people)
French comics writers